Lena Doolin Mason (May 6, 1864 – August 28, 1924) was an American Methodist preacher and poet.

Biography

Lena Doolin was born on May 6, 1864 in Quincy, Illinois to Vaughn and Relda Doolin. 
She joined the congregation of Hannibal, Missouri's African Methodist Episcopal Church in 1872. 
She attended Douglass High School in Hannibal and Professor Knott's School in Chicago. In 1883, she married George Mason. Their daughter was the only one of their six children to survive to adulthood. When she was 23, Mason entered the ministry, preaching exclusively to white people for her first three years.

Mason was a noted orator. During her career, she was a member of the Colored Conference and preached in "nearly every state in the Union."

Mason also wrote songs and composed poetry. Only two of her poems are extant, "A Negro in It," written in response to the Assassination of William McKinley, and "The Negro in Education." For the latter poem, she subverted the standard pro-slavery argument that education makes people unfit to be slaves.

References

Further reading
Curry, Ora Anderson. "Uncrowned Queen." African American Women: Community Builders of Western New York.
Hine, Darlene Clarke. Black Women in America, A–L. Brooklyn, N.Y.: Carlson Publishing, 1993.
Gates, Henry Louis, Jr., and Evelyn Brooks Higginbotham. The African American National Biography. New York: Oxford University Press, 2007.

1864 births
1924 deaths
African Methodist Episcopal Church clergy
People from Quincy, Illinois
People from Hannibal, Missouri
American women poets
20th-century American poets
20th-century American women writers
20th-century American clergy
Poets from Illinois
Poets from Missouri
19th-century American clergy
Religious leaders from Illinois
Religious leaders from Missouri